Tropidozineus tersus is a species of beetle in the family Cerambycidae. It was described by Melzer in 1931.

References

Tropidozineus
Beetles described in 1931